The 11th Canadian Film Awards were held on June 5, 1959 to honour achievements in Canadian film. The ceremony was hosted by W. J. Sheridan, the president of the Canadian Public Relations Society.

Winners
Film of the Year: Not awarded
Feature Film: No entries submitted
Theatrical Short: The Tall Country — Parry Films, Lew Parry producer, Osmond Borradaile director
Money Minters — Crawley Films, Ted De Wit producer and director
The Quest — National Film Board of Canada, Nicholas Balla producer, Stanley Jackson director
Arts and Experimental: Not awarded
TV Information: Winter Crossing at L'Isle-Aux-Coudres — National Film Board of Canada, Pierre Perrault producer, René Bonnière and Pierre Perrault, directors
One Day's Poison — National Film Board of Canada, David Bairstow producer, Donald Wilder director
Blood and Fire — National Film Board of Canada, Wolf Koenig and Roman Kroitor producers, Terence Macartney-Filgate director
Films for Children: Not awarded
Travel and Recreation: Grey Cup Festival '58 — Chetwynd Films, Arthur Chetwynd producer and director
Quetico — Christopher Chapman and Bill Mason producers, Christopher Chapman director
General Information: The Living Stone — National Film Board of Canada, Tom Daly producer, John Feeney director
Public Relations: Saskatchewan, Our University — National Film Board of Canada, Edmund Reid producer and director
Sales Promotion: Beauty to Live With — National Film Board of Canada, Edmund Reid producer and director
Training and Instruction: Fire in Town — National Film Board of Canada, Peter Jones producer, Julian Biggs director
Filmed Commercial: Du Maurier Cigarettes — Omega Productions, Richard J. Jarvis producer
Amateur: Watch Out — John W. Ruddell
Pinoke — Jack S. Grassick

Special Awards
- Canadian Broadcasting Corporation — "for its encouragement of the appreciation of good filmmaking over the years through Gerald Pratley's two weekly radio programs, The Movie Scene and Music from the Films".
- Dean Walker (writer) — "for encouragement of high standards in Canadian film production through his articles".

References

Canadian
Canadian Film Awards (1949–1978)
1959 in Canada